Darling Point is a harbourside eastern suburb of Sydney, Australia. It is 4 kilometres east of the Sydney central business district and is part of the local government area of Woollahra Council.

Darling Point is bounded by Sydney Harbour to the north, Double Bay to the east, Edgecliff to the south and Rushcutters Bay to the west. Darling Point, renowned for its desirable and expensive real estate, is mostly residential and regarded as one of the most exclusive and prestigious suburbs in Australia.

History 
What is now the Darling Point area was originally known as Eurambi, Yarranabbi, Yarrandabbi and Yaranabe by the local Aboriginal people. It was named Darling Point in recognition of Elizabeth Darling, the wife of New South Wales Governor Ralph Darling.

During the Sydney 2000 Olympics, Darling Point hosted the sailing events.

Transport 
Darling Point Road follows the ridge of the headland that is Darling Point. Mona Road and Greenoaks Avenue act as two other main access roads to the suburb. New Beach Road runs between the western boundary of the suburb and Rushcutters Bay Park. The 327 bus service used to go through Darling Point but it has been reduced to a lesser route, now called 328. Darling Point ferry wharf provides access to Double Bay ferry services. Darling Point is also serviced by the nearby Edgecliff railway station.

Parks 
McKell Park was originally the site of the now-demolished Canonbury House, but is now a public park. Situated at the northern end of Darling Point Road, it has panoramic views of Sydney Harbour and is a popular location for picnics and weddings. It also provides access to Darling Point's ferry stop.

"The Drill Hall" forms part of the Sir David Martin Reserve and was previously part of the Royal Australian Navy base, HMAS Rushcutter. The Drill hall is one of the oldest-surviving Australian military buildings and was originally located on Bennelong Point, now the location of the Sydney Opera House.

Places of worship 
Saint Mark's Anglican Church in Darling Point Road was designed by Edmund Blacket in 1852 and is now a popular wedding venue. It has hosted weddings such as Elton John's first wedding and the fictional wedding in the film Muriel's Wedding. The rectory, also designed by Blacket, is listed on the local government heritage register.

Landmarks

Craigend 
Situated close to McKell Park, Craigend is a mansion constructed in the Moorish and Art Deco styles in 1935, including a pair of doors from an ancient mosque in Zanzibar and a traditional Japanese garden. In 1948, the property was acquired by the US government as the official residence of the Consul-General. It has since returned to the private sector. In 1975, it served as the shooting location for the villain's lair in the Hong Kong / Australian co-production The Man from Hong Kong. The house is heritage-listed.

Carthona 
Built in 1841 for the Surveyor-General Sir Thomas Mitchell, Carthona is a harborside sandstone mansion located at the end of Carthona Avenue. With its panoramic water views across Double Bay, to Point Piper, and north toward Manly, it is considered one of Sydney's most-valuable properties. It is currently held by descendants of Philip Bushell, the tea merchant, who died at the home in 1954. It is heritage-listed.

Heritage listings

Darling Point has a number of heritage-listed sites, including:
 1a Carthona Avenue: Lindesay
 68 Darling Point Road: The Swifts
 103 Darling Point Road: Babworth House
 11–21 Greenoaks Avenue: Bishopscourt

In additional, the following buildings are on the (now defunct) Register of the National Estate.
 Cloncorrick, Annandale Street
 Callooa and garden, Bennett Avenue
 Carthona, Carthona Avenue
 Mona, Mona Road

Clubs 
The Cruising Yacht Club of Australia, Australia's premier yacht club, is situated near Rushcutters Bay Park and runs the annual Sydney to Hobart Yacht Race.

Population

Demographics 

The most common ancestries in Darling Point were English (24.1%), Australian (15.1%), Irish (9.7%), Scottish 7.4% and Chinese 3.3%.  54.2% of residents were born in Australia. The most common countries of birth were England 5.3%, New Zealand 3.4% and South Africa 3.2%. 72.6% of people spoke only English at home. The most common responses for religion were No Religion 27.2%, Catholic 18.3% and Anglican 16.5%. The median weekly household income in Darling Point was $2,966, slightly more than double the national median of $1,438. Darling Point is a suburb with high density housing, with 87.3% of occupied private dwellings being flats, units or apartments, 6.3% being separate houses and 5.5% being semi-detached.

At the 2021 census, the population of Darling Point was 3,977.

According to analysis of Australian Taxation Office return records by the Queensland University of Technology, Darling Point donates more money to charities than any other area in Australia. This is primarily as the residents of the area are generally wealthy and make good use of the tax reductions that come with donations.

Notable residents 
 Harry Rickards, (1843–1911) English-Australian vaudeville artist and theatre impresario, and his wife Kate Rickards, former trapeze artist and later a musical theatre actress

References 

 
Suburbs of Sydney
1833 establishments in Australia